Punt PI is a fact-based comedy radio series on BBC Radio 4 in which Steve Punt investigates mysteries in Britain.

Format
Each episode is 30 minutes long and there are three or four episodes in each series.

Starting with series two, every episode starts with a ringing phone and then the answering machine of "Punt's Private Eye". A mysterious individual identified only as 'Tracy' then speaks into the answering machine and asks Punt to investigate a mystery he has heard about.

All episodes follow a similar format of Steve Punt introducing the mystery, before heading off to speak to witnesses and experts, and investigating different theories and leads.

Episodes

Series 1 (May 2008)
A couple who found 400 false legs hidden under their floorboards
Britain's Strategic steam reserve
Numerous aeroplane crashes at Dark Peak in the Peak District

Series 2 (June 2009)
Adolf Hitler's plans for a headquarters in Balham, South West London, possibly at Du Cane Court
Television licence detector vans
The possibility of a real Manchurian Candidate

Series 3 (September and October 2010)
The phantom settlement of Argleton
Nazi UFOs
A possible recording of Queen Victoria's voice
The curse of The Crying Boy

Series 4 (September and December 2011)
The murder of Hubert Chevis by poisoned partridge
A death ray allegedly made by Harry Grindell Matthews
A missing film about David Lloyd George
The Battle of Watling Street

Series 5 (September 2012)
The arsenal of Kris Ruddjers
The Charfield railway disaster
The lost Roanoke Colony

Series 6 (August 2013)
The disappearance of William Cantelo
The Hollinwell incident
The murder of Charles Walton
The killing of two bears in the Forest of Dean

Series 7 (July and August 2014)
The Mysterious Death of Flying Millionaire Alfred Loewenstein
The 1971 Baker Street Bank Robbery
The Case of the MP (Victor Grayson) Who Vanished
Who put Bella in the Wych Elm?

Series 8 (August 2015)
The Murder of Hollywood director William Desmond Taylor
The Case of the Missing Cezanne
The Great Mull Air Mystery looking at mysterious death of hotel guest Peter Gibbs

Series 9 (July and August 2016)
The Suspicious Death of Emile Zola
The Reclusive Skeleton of Fingringhoe, exploring the disappearance of actress Constance Kent
There's a Kind of Hum

Series 10 (September 2017)
Lost Nukes
Treasure in the Piano
Missing Priest
Taking the Pissoir?

BBC Radio 4 programmes